St. Peter Claver High School is a private Catholic secondary boarding school, located approximately  from the centre of Dodoma, the national capital of the United Republic of Tanzania. The school was founded by the Society of Jesus in 2011 and is situated on a  campus.

References

External links
 Official website

Jesuit secondary schools in Tanzania
Private schools in Tanzania
Educational institutions established in 2011
2011 establishments in Tanzania
Buildings and structures in Dodoma